Torridge District Council in Devon, England is elected every four years. Since the last boundary changes in 2003, 36 councillors have been elected from 23 wards.

Political control
The first election to the council was held in 1973, initially operating as a shadow authority before coming into its powers on 1 April 1974. Political control of the council since 1973 has been held by the following parties:

Leadership
The leaders of the council since 2004 have been:

Council elections
Summary of the council composition after recent council elections, click on the year for full details of each election. Boundary changes took place for the 2003 election.

1973 Torridge District Council election
1976 Torridge District Council election
1979 Torridge District Council election (New ward boundaries & district boundary changes also took place)
1983 Torridge District Council election
1987 Torridge District Council election
1991 Torridge District Council election
1995 Torridge District Council election
1999 Torridge District Council election
2003 Torridge District Council election
2007 Torridge District Council election
2011 Torridge District Council election
2015 Torridge District Council election
2019 Torridge District Council election

District result maps

By-election results
By-elections occur when seats become vacant between council elections. Below is a summary of recent by-elections; full by-election results can be found by clicking on the by-election name.

References

External links
Torridge District Council

 
Council elections in Devon
District council elections in England